Femke Stoltenborg (born 30 July 1991) is a Dutch volleyball player, who plays as a setter. 
She is a member of the Netherlands Women's National Team. 
She participated at the 2010 FIVB Volleyball World Grand Prix, and 2017 FIVB Volleyball World Grand Prix.

On the club level, she plays for Ladies in Black Aachen.

References

External links
FIVB profile

1991 births
Living people
Dutch women's volleyball players
Dutch expatriate sportspeople in Germany
Dutch expatriate sportspeople in Italy
European Games competitors for the Netherlands
Expatriate volleyball players in Germany
Expatriate volleyball players in Italy
People from Winterswijk
Sportspeople from Gelderland
Volleyball players at the 2015 European Games
Volleyball players at the 2016 Summer Olympics
LGBT volleyball players
Setters (volleyball)
Olympic volleyball players of the Netherlands
21st-century Dutch women